Varanasi Municipal Corporation is the governing body of the city of Varanasi in the Indian state of Uttar Pradesh. The municipal corporation consists of democratically elected members, is headed by a mayor, and administers the city's infrastructure and public services. Members from the state's leading various political parties hold elected offices in the corporation.

History

Varanasi has been a metropolitan municipality with a mayor-council form of government. Varanasi Municipal Corporation was established on 24 January 1959 as a Nagar Mahapalika under the Municipal Corporation Act of 1959 and in 1994 it was ungraded to Nagar Nigam. The Varanasi Municipal Corporation is responsible for public education, correctional institutions, libraries, public safety, recreational facilities, sanitation, water supply, local planning, and welfare services. The mayor and councilors are elected to five-year terms.

Varanasi Municipal Corporation is part of various government schemes like Swachh Bharat Mission, Hriday, Amrut as well as Smart Cities Mission.

References

Municipal corporations in Uttar Pradesh
Government of Varanasi
1959 establishments in Uttar Pradesh